Maulana Abul Kalam Muhammad Yusuf (19 March 1926 – 9 February 2014) was a Bangladeshi religious scholar, writer, activist and politician. Yusuf was a specialist in the study of Hadith (Prophetic tradition): he earned the title "Mumtaz al-Muhaddethin" for his advanced degree in hadith sciences, and has also published books widely in the field.

Yusuf has traveled widely and represented Bangladesh at numerous national and international forums. He served as the Chairman of Bangladesh Peasants' Welfare Society for over 35 years, the Chairman of Darul-Arabia wa Darul-Ifta Bangladesh for more than 30 years, and as a senior official of Jamaat-e-Islami Bangladesh in various capacities for more than 60 years. Implicated for war crimes he was allegedly party to in the 1971 Liberation War of Bangladesh, the International Crimes Tribunal, a domestic war crimes tribunal in Bangladesh set up specifically to investigate and prosecute suspects for the genocide committed in 1971, indicted him on 13 charges of genocide and crimes against humanity. He died in custody on 9 February 2014.

Early life and education

Maulana Abul Kalam Muhammad Yusuf hailed from the village of Rajair (Sarankhala), Bagerhat district in Bangladesh. He completed his primary education from his village school and later from a school at Rayenda. His secondary level schooling was completed from Galua Madrasa Barisal, followed by the Sharshina Aliya Madrasa and finally Amtali Madrasa in Barisal, where he began his education in nahw and sarf (Arabic grammar and morphology), as well as hadith and Qur'anic tafseer.

Yusuf completed his undergraduate (Fazil) and graduate (Kamil) levels education in Alia Madrasa situated in Dhaka. In 1950, he achieved 1st position in the country on the basis of merit in the Fazil (Honors) examination under the East Pakistan Madrasa Board. Following this, he completed his graduate (Kamil) examinations in 1952, attaining recognition as Mumtaz al-Muhaddethin, the highest distinction available to scholars of Islam in South Asia.

He started his profession as a madrasa teacher in 1952 and became the principal of Khulna Alia Madrasa in 1958. He also taught at Tikikata Senior Madrasa in Mothbaria (Barisal), where he served as Head Master.

Leadership of various social institutions

Yusuf headed the Bangladesh Peasants' Welfare Society (BPWS), which he founded in 1977 as a non-government and non-profit social welfare organization. He has also founded and chaired an Arabic-research and fatwa institute called Darul-Arabia wa Darul-Ifta situated in Dhaka. Since its founding, the institute has become a renowned center for the translation of classical Arabic and Islamic literature authored by well-known scholars into Bengali and also publishes "Al-Huda", an Arabic language monthly from Bangladesh. It has a wide circulation in the Middle East.

Leadership in Jamaat-e-Islami Bangladesh

Yusuf joined the Jamaat-e-Islami in 1952. Rising quickly within its ranks, he was Ameer of the Khulna Division of the party from 1956 until October 1958. In October 1958, all parties were banned in the aftermath of the declaration of martial law  in Pakistan by President Ayub Khan. After martial law was lifted Yusuf  was appointed as the Naib-e-Ameer (Vice President) for the party's East Pakistan division. From 1962, until the independence of Bangladesh in 1971, he was also a member of Jamaat's Majlis-e-Shura (Central Executive Council) for three consecutive full terms, under the leadership of Sayyid Abul A'la Maududi (Maududi).

After 1971, Yusuf served in various capacities in providing senior leadership for Jamaat. He was selected Secretary General for one term under Ameer Maulana Abdur Rahim. He again served in the same capacity for three consecutive terms under Jamaat Ameer Ghulam Azam and was elected as Senior Naib-e-Ameer during the second tenure of Ameer Maulana Motiur Rahman Nizami. He continued in this role until his death.

Political career
In the 1962 elections, Yusuf was nominated by Jamaat to run on behalf of his constituency Khulna and Barisal. Taking leave of absence from his teaching position at the Alia Madrasa, he contested the elections and won. At 35 years of age, he was at the time the youngest representative in the National Assembly of Pakistan.

He actively participated in the civil unrest movement against dictator Ayub Khan in the 1960s and was part of the Pakistan Democratic Movement (PDM) from 1965 to 1968 and later of the Democratic Action Committee (DAC), working alongside notable leaders such as Sheikh Mujibur Rahman, Ataur Rahman Khan, Nawabzada Nasrullah Khan, Chowdhury Golam Mohammad and many others.

Role during Liberation War

During the war, he became a member of the Abdul Motaleb Malik-led cabinet and served as Revenue Minister. However, all the cabinet members had resigned on 14 December, only two days before the country's independence, as they "decided to resign observing the country's situation,". Due to his high-profile political stance during the war, Yusuf was identified among 14 top collaborators who were ordered to surrender after promulgation of the Collaborators Act 1972. The list was made addressing Yusuf himself, Nurul Amin, Ghulam Azam, Khan A Sabur, Shah Azizur Rahman, Maulana Muhammad Ishaq, Khawaja Khayeruddin, Mahmud Ali, Abbas Ali Khan and many others as collaborators. Awami League leader Obaydullah Mazumder of Feni was among the list of the collaborators.

Fifty thousand collaborators were arrested under the Collaborators Act 1972, among whom 752 were found guilty and were sentenced to varying degrees of imprisonment. Yusuf, despite his political stance of opposing the war of independence, was among those who received Mujibur Rahman's general amnesty in 1973 following a period of imprisonment in lieu of absence of any charges of killing, rape, loot or arson against him during the war.

War Crimes trial

Arrest

On 12 May 2013, Bangladeshi police arrested Yusuf in Dhaka on charges of war crimes, charging him with 15 crimes dating back to Bangladesh's 1971 war of independence with Pakistan, including genocide, killing, looting, arson and forcing members of minority faiths to convert to Islam. Police alleged that he was the founder of the infamous Razakar Bahini, who were notorious for their operations that targeted Hindus as well as civilians suspected of being sympathetic towards Bengali nationalists.

Charges

According to the prosecution, Yusuf had formed the first team of Razakars (volunteers) on 5 May 1971 with 96 members of Jamaat in Khulna. He started gathering people for the force on 18 April. Yusuf was also reported as the regional chief of anti-liberation force Peace Committee, facing 15 war crimes charges, which included genocide, killing, looting, arson and forcing members of minority faiths to convert to Islam.

His defence team argued that Yusuf, then 87, required to be granted bail immediately because of his old age. Prosecutors however opposed the bail application, arguing that Yusuf had remained politically active despite his advancing years and should remain in jail to prevent him influencing trial proceedings. Subsequently, his bail was rejected and he was sent to jail.

Death

On the morning of 9 February 2014, Yusuf, a survivor of two previous heart surgeries, suffered a fatal stroke while in prison custody.

Books

Yusuf is a well-known scholar in his own right and published several widely read books, including titles on Qur'anic studies and hadith. Along with writing a couple of travelogues and a memoir, he also published analytic essays on national and international politics.

Personal life

Yusuf married in 1949. He had eight children of whom five are daughters and three are sons.

See also 
 Shankharikathi massacre

References

External links
 Maulana AKM Yusuf: Biography

1926 births
2014 deaths
Bangladesh Jamaat-e-Islami politicians
Government Madrasah-e-Alia alumni
Bangladeshi people who died in prison custody
Prisoners who died in Bangladeshi detention
People indicted for genocide